Nigel Shafran (born 1964) is a photographer and artist. His work has been exhibited at Tate and the Victoria and Albert Museum. In the 1980s Shafran worked as a fashion photographer, before turning to fine art photography. Talking to The Guardian journalist Sarah Philips, Shafran described his work as, "a build-up of images, often in sequences. There is a connection between them all. Basically, I'm a one-trick pony: it's all life and death and that's it."

Publications
Ruthbook. Self-published, 1995. Supported by Focal Point Gallery. Edition of 600 copies.
Dad’s Office. Self-published, 1999. . Edition of 1000 copies.
Edited Photographs: Photoworks Monograph. Brighton, Photoworks; Göttingen, Steidl: 2004. . Photographs by Shafran. Edited by Celia Davies, with essays by Val Williams and Paul Elliman, and an interview with Shafran by Charlotte Cotton.
Flowers for  __. London: Koenig, 2008. . Edition of 750 copies.
Ruth on the phone. Roma publications, 2012. .
Teenage Precinct Shoppers. Dashwood Books, 2013. Edition of 500 copies.
Visitor Figures: Out-takes from the V&A Museum Annual Review 2012-13. Self-published, 2015. Edition of 350 copies.
Dark Rooms. London: Mack, 2016. . Co-edited by Liz Jobey. With texts by David Chandler and Paul Elliman.
The People on the Streets. 2018.

Solo exhibitions
2000: Photographs by Nigel Shafran, 1992-2000, Taka Ishi Gallery, Japan
2001: Washing Up 2000, Fig-1, London
2004: Nigel Shafran, MW projects, London
2008: Flowers for  __, Rencontres d'Arles, Arles, France
2010: Compost pictures, 2008-9, Charleston, Firle, East Sussex, UK

Collections
Victoria and Albert Museum, London
Arts Council England

References

External links

English photographers
Fashion photographers
1964 births
Living people